Nový Bydžov is a town in Hradec Králové District in the Hradec Králové Region of the Czech Republic. It has about 7,000 inhabitants. The historic town centre is well preserved and is protected by law as an urban monument zone and the Vysočany part of Nový Bydžov is protected as a village monument zone.

Administrative parts

Villages of Chudonice, Nová Skřeněř, Skochovice, Stará Skřeněř, Vysočany, Zábědov and Žantov are administrative parts of Nový Bydžov.

Geography
It lies in a flat agricultural landscape of the East Elbe Table. The town is situated on the Cidlina River.

History
The first written mention of Nový Bydžov is from 1305, when it was a royal town of King Wenceslaus II. In 1325, King John of Bohemia sold it to the Wartemberg family. In 1516 the property passed into the hands of the Pernštejn family, and during their rule the town prospered and gained new privileges. With the permission of the nobility, the Jewish population settled in the town. From 1548, Nový Bydžov was owned by the Waldstein family.

In 1569, Nový Bydžov was exempt by payment from servitude and became the royal dowry town. The development of the town was stopped by the Thirty Years' War.

From 1751 to 1784, it was the royal seat of the newly created Nový Bydžov Region which included the Giant Mountains from Vrchlabí through Jilemnice, Nová Paka, Jičín, Hořice, Nový Bydžov, Chlumec nad Cidlinou and Poděbrady as far as Sadská. In 1784, the seat of the region was transferred to Jičín due to its position, but the name of the region remained the same until 1850. In 1850, it was still the most populated town in the region.

Nový Bydžov was then from 1850 until 1960 the district centre. After districts had been abolished it did not cease to be the natural centre of the region.

Demographics

Economy
The largest employer with its headquarters in the town is Datwyler Sealing Technologies CZ, a manufacturer of rubber products. It employs more than 500 people.

Transport
Nový Bydžov is located on a regional railway line Kolín–Trutnov and on a local railway line heading from Městec Králové to Lomnice nad Popelkou.

Culture
Since the 1840s, the town is known for its annual student celebrations called merenda.

Sights

The historic core has regular medieval floor plan with Masarykovo Square in the centre. In the middle of the square is a Marian plague column from 1716. The town hall from 1862–1865 is one of the most valuable Neo-Gothic town halls in the country. The Art Nouveau building of the former savings bank from 1905–1907 houses today the Town Museum. The museum contains exhibits on prehistory of the region, rural ethnography, the Bydžov Ark (a winged plate altar), paintings by Petr Brandl, and sculptures of the naïve artist Václav Kudera-Křapík.

The most valuable building is the Church of Saint Lawrence from the early 14th century. It is a unique example of a preserved Gothic church unaffected by reconstructions. In the eastern part of the town is the Church of Saint James the Great, built in the late Baroque style in 1768–1775. Other churches include Church of the Holy Trinity, Church of Our Lady of Sorrows, or Church of Saint Margaret the Virgin in Vysočany with the wooden bell tower.

There are two Jewish cemeteries. The Old Cemetery was founded in 1520 and is the third largest in the Czech Republic. The oldest preserved tomb is from 1577. The New Synagogue is also preserved and today serves as a chapel of the Moravian Church.

Notable people
Josef Schnitter (1852–1914), Czech-Bulgarian architect, chief architect of Plovdiv
Karel Boromejský Mádl (1859–1932), art historian and critic
Karel Šviha (1877–1937), politician
Zdeněk Jarkovský (1918–1948), ice hockey player

Twin towns – sister cities

Nový Bydžov is twinned with:
 Brezno, Slovakia
 Cascinette d'Ivrea, Italy
 Nădlac, Romania

References

External links

Populated places in Hradec Králové District
Cities and towns in the Czech Republic